15436 Dexius, provisional designation: , is a large Jupiter trojan from the Greek camp, approximately  in diameter. It was discovered on 10 November 1998, by astronomers of the Lincoln Near-Earth Asteroid Research at the Lincoln Laboratory's Experimental Test Site near Socorro, New Mexico. The presumed C-type asteroid has a rotation period of 8.97 hours. It is one of the 50 largest Jupiter trojans and was named after Dexius, father of Iphinous from Greek mythology.

Orbit and classification 

Dexius is a dark Jovian asteroid orbiting in the leading Greek camp at Jupiter's  Lagrangian point, 60° ahead of its orbit in a 1:1 resonance (see Trojans in astronomy). It is a non-family asteroid in the Jovian background population. It orbits the Sun at a distance of 5.0–5.4 AU once every 11 years and 11 months (4,344 days; semi-major axis of 5.21 AU). Its orbit has an eccentricity of 0.04 and an inclination of 16° with respect to the ecliptic.

Numbering and naming 

This minor planet was numbered on 21 June 2000. On 14 May 2021, the object was named by the Working Group Small Body Nomenclature (WGSBN), after Dexius, father of Iphinous from Greek mythology.

Physical characteristics 

Dexius is a generically assumed C-type asteroid.

Rotation period 

In 2013 and 2014, two rotational lightcurves of Dexius were obtained from photometric observations by Robert Stephens at the Trojan Station of Center for Solar System Studies  in Landers, California. Lightcurve analysis gave an identical rotation period of 8.97 hours with a brightness amplitude of 0.15 and 0.29 magnitude, respectively.

Diameter and albedo 

According to the surveys carried out by the Japanese Akari satellite, the Infrared Astronomical Satellite IRAS, and the NEOWISE mission of NASA's Wide-field Infrared Survey Explorer (WISE), this Jovian trojan measures between 78.63 and 87.65 kilometers in diameter and its surface has an albedo between 0.038 and 0.053. The Collaborative Asteroid Lightcurve Link derives an albedo of 0.0547 and a diameter of 86.00 kilometers based on an absolute magnitude of 9.1.

Notes

References

External links 
 Asteroid Lightcurve Database (LCDB), query form (info )
 Center for Solar System Studies (CS3)
 Discovery Circumstances: Numbered Minor Planets (15001)-(20000) – Minor Planet Center
 
 

015436
015436
015436
Named minor planets
19981110